Jin Dae-Sung (born 19 September 1989) is a South Korean footballer who plays as midfielder for Gangneung City FC.

Career
He was selected by Jeju United in 2012 K League draft.

References

External links 

1989 births
Living people
Association football midfielders
South Korean footballers
Jeju United FC players
Ulsan Hyundai Mipo Dockyard FC players
Daejeon Hana Citizen FC players
Gimcheon Sangmu FC players
K League 1 players
K League 2 players
Korea National League players